The World Freshwater Angling Championships is a freshwater angling competition. Participating countries fish in teams of five with titles awarded to the team with the least amount of points, the competition area is split into sections and the winner with the most weight will be awarded one point, two for second, three for third, at the end of the two days the team with the least points is the top team. Since its inception in 1954, the competition has been staged on rivers, canals and still waters from a selected host nation. Currently (to 2021), the world championships have not been held outside of Europe. 

The 68th event was held in September 2022 at Bilje, in Osijek-Baranja County, Croatia. Held at Lake Biljsko Jezero which holds prussian carp, dwarf catfish, grass carp, catfish, asp, bighead, red perch, silver bream, ide and carassius. First-time world champions were  Serbia, with  Italy in second place and  Czech Republic in third. and the individual new world champion was  Mihael Pongrac of Croatia.

Brief history
The inaugural world championship was held in West Germany in 1954 and won by team England, with the first individual title going to Gino Vigarani of Italy.
In 1992, Dave Wesson, an Australian, became the only non-European to win the title. The 2020 World Freshwater Angling Championships was cancelled due to the COVID-19 pandemic but resumed in 2021. The host nation have been team champions on 15 occasions, with the strongest nation at home being Italy who have won on their own waters 6 times, the others were Belgium 2, France, Luxembourg, Romania, East Germany, West Germany, England, Spain. The host nation has produced a home grown individual world champion from just 9 events of the 67 fished (one in seven).
For a video history of this major angling event, see External links at the bottom of this page.

World Championship Nations Team Results

World Championship Individual results

Championship records

Team medal table

References

External links
Video of 49th World coarse angling championships in N.Ireland 1992
Video of 51st World coarse angling championships in Belgium 2004
Video of 56th World coarse angling championships in Netherlands 2009
Video of 57th World coarse angling championships in Spain 2010
Video of 58th World coarse angling championships in Italy 2011
Video of 59th World coarse angling championships in Czech 2012
Video of 60th World coarse angling championships in Poland 2013
Video of 61st World coarse angling championships in Croatia 2014
Video of 62nd World coarse angling championships in Slovenia 2015
Video of 63rd World coarse angling championships in Bulgaria 2016
Video of 64th World coarse angling championships in Belgium 2017
Video of 65th World coarse angling championships in Portugal 2018
Video of 66th World coarse angling championships in Serbia 2019
Video of 67th World coarse angling championships in Italy 2021

World championships
Freshwater Angling
Recreational fishing
Sport fish
Recurring sporting events established in 1954